The Platinum Album is a 2013 compilation album by Australian recording artist Judith Durham. The album was released on 5 July 2013.

Background
Durham suffered a brain haemorrhage on May 14, 2013 after coming off stage in Melbourne with her band The Seekers, just two months short of her 70th birthday.

To celebrate her recovery, her 70th birthday and 50 years in the industry, it was announced The Platinum Album would be released, including her solo songs and hits with The Seekers.

The album includes notes by Judith herself, her biographer Graham Simpson, and the celebrated writer/musician Chris Patrick, and includes rare and vintage photographs.

Reception
Mark Walker of ClassikOn reviewed the album positively, stating "Judith's voice shows little of the passage of her 70 years and is at the heart of what makes this album special." He further said "Resembling many of her post-Seekers releases, it contains a few jazzy numbers, one or two of a blues persuasion, a few covers, and two of The Seekers most popular numbers, "Morningtown Ride" and "The Carnival is Over"."

Track listing
All tracks were personally selected by Judith. Many available for the first time on compact disc. The album includes two tracks that were recorded especially for the album.
The tracks are in alphabetical order.

Charts
The Platinum Album debuted and peaked at number 36 on the ARIA Albums Chart.

Weekly charts

Year-end charts

References

2013 greatest hits albums
Judith Durham compilation albums
Decca Records compilation albums
Universal Music Australia albums